Jake Bean (born June 9, 1998) is a Canadian professional ice hockey defenceman who currently plays for the Columbus Blue Jackets of the National Hockey League (NHL). Bean was drafted in the first round, 13th overall in the 2016 NHL Entry Draft by the Carolina Hurricanes.

Playing career
While playing for Edge School during the 2013–14 season, Bean was awarded the Canadian Sport School Hockey League’s Elite 15 Top Defenceman award.

Bean went undrafted in the WHL Bantam draft, and was able to sign with his hometown Calgary Hitmen. Bean impressed in his rookie season with the Hitmen, posting 39 points in 51 games. He also broke the Hitmen rookie record for most points in a single season by a rookie defenceman. The next season, Bean recorded a career high in goals and assists to get him drafted 13th overall by the Carolina Hurricanes.

On July 9, 2016, Bean was signed to a three-year, entry-level contract with the Carolina Hurricanes. At the conclusion of the 2016–17 season with the Hitmen, Bean was re-assigned to join and train with the Hurricanes AHL affiliate, the Charlotte Checkers. However, he did not play a game for them and returned to the Hitmen for the following season.

During the 2017–18 season, Bean was named an alternate captain for the Hitmen, along with Beck Malenstyn. On January 6, 2018, Bean was traded to the Tri-City Americans.

On July 23, 2021, Bean was traded by the Hurricanes to the Columbus Blue Jackets in exchange for a second-round pick in the 2021 NHL Entry Draft. As a restricted free agent, Bean was signed to a three-year, $7 million contract extension with the Blue Jackets on July 30, 2021.

Career statistics

Regular season and playoffs

International

Awards and honours

References

External links

1998 births
Living people
Calgary Hitmen players
Canadian ice hockey defencemen
Carolina Hurricanes draft picks
Carolina Hurricanes players
Charlotte Checkers (2010–) players
Columbus Blue Jackets players
National Hockey League first-round draft picks
Ice hockey people from Calgary
Tri-City Americans players